Kaweesh Kumara (born 10 February 1998) is a Sri Lankan cricketer. He made his Twenty20 debut for Sri Lanka Army Sports Club in the 2018–19 SLC Twenty20 Tournament on 15 February 2019. He made his List A debut for Sri Lanka Army Sports Club in the 2018–19 Premier Limited Overs Tournament on 4 March 2019.

References

External links
 

1998 births
Living people
Sri Lankan cricketers
Sri Lanka Army Sports Club cricketers
Place of birth missing (living people)